The Battle of Vimy Ridge was a military engagement fought as part of the Battle of Arras, in the Nord-Pas-de-Calais region of France, during the First World War. The main combatants were the Canadian Corps against three divisions of the German Sixth Army. The battle was part of the opening phase of the Battle of Arras, part Nivelle Offensive and took place from 9–12 April 1917. The objective of the Canadian Corps was to take control of the German-held high ground, along an escarpment at the northernmost end of the Arras Offensive. This would ensure that the southern flank could advance without suffering German enfilade fire.

This listing covers Allied Powers and Central Powers formations and units involved in the battle. Although the Canadian side is well studied, historians have had trouble determining the exact dispositions of the German forces and even more trouble assessing the casualties it suffered in the battle. The Canadian Corps suffered 10,602 casualties; 3,598 killed and 7,004 wounded. The German Sixth Army suffered an unknown number of casualties with an approximate 4,000 men becoming prisoners of war.

The significance of the Battle of Vimy Ridge is most strongly felt in Canada. Elsewhere the battle is principally noted as part of the much larger British offensive known as the Battles of Arras 1917. The historical reality of the battle has been reworked and reinterpreted, in a conscious attempt to give purpose and meaning to an event which came to symbolize Canada's coming of age as a nation. The idea that Canada achieved nationhood as a direct result of the experiences of the First World War, is an opinion widely held in military histories of Canada and also regularly appears in general histories.  A  portion of the former battleground is preserved memorial park and site of the Canadian National Vimy Memorial.

Allied Powers forces
Canadian Corps commander Lieutenant-General Sir Julian Byng had four attacking divisions, one division of reserves and numerous support units under his command. He was supported to the north by the 24th British Division of I Corps which advanced north of the Souchez river and by the advancing XVII Corps to the south. The 4th Canadian Division was responsible for the northern portion of the advance which included the capture of the highest point of the ridge followed by the heavily defended knoll known as "the Pimple" just north of the town of Givenchy-en-Gohelle. The 3rd Canadian Division was responsible for the narrow central section of the ridge, including the capture of La Folie Farm. The 2nd Canadian Division, which later included an additional brigade from the 5th British Division was directly south of 3rd Canadian Division and entrusted with the capture of the town of Thélus. The 1st Canadian Division was responsible for the broad southern sector of the corps advance and was expected to make the greatest advance in terms distance. Byng also planned for a healthy reserve for contingencies in case additional troops were needed to relieve forward troops, help in consolidating positions or aiding the 4th Canadian Division with the capture of "the Pimple". As a result, the 9th Canadian Brigade, 15th British Brigade and 95th British Brigade were kept in a corps-level reserve.

Canadian Corps

Central Powers forces
German Sixth Army commander General Ludwig von Falkenhausen had 20 divisions (plus reserves) responsible for the Cambrai–Lille sector. Vimy Ridge itself was principally defended by the ad hoc  formation under the I Bavarian Reserve Corps commander General der Infanterie Karl von Fasbender.

Three divisions were ultimately responsible for manning the front-line defences opposite the Canadian Corps. The 16th Bavarian Infantry Division was located opposite the town of Souchez and responsible for the defence of the northernmost section of the ridge. The division had been created in January 1917 from existing Bavarian formations and had so far only opposed the Canadian Corps. The 79th Reserve Division was responsible for the defence of the central section, including the highest point of the ridge, Hill 145. The 79th Reserve Division had fought for two years on the Eastern Front and was transferred to the Vimy sector at the end of February 1917. The 1st Bavarian Reserve Division had been in the Arras area since October 1914 and was holding the villages of Thélus, Bailleul and the southern slope of the ridge.

I Bavarian Reserve Corps

VIII Reserve Corps

Notes

References

 
 
 
 
 
 
 
 
 
 
 
 

World War I orders of battle
Battles of the Western Front (World War I)
Canada in World War I
Battles of World War I involving Canada
Battles of World War I involving Germany